Gardianul ("The Guardian") was a Romanian daily newspaper published in Bucharest. It claimed to have had an anti-corruption stance, investigating organized crime and high-level corruption. 

The newspaper was founded in 2002 by Şerban Roibu, the son of a Social Democratic Party senator and therefore is accused of bias in favour of the Social Democratic Party, although it did publish articles which are critical of Social Democrat members being investigated for corruption. It eventually was sold to "Petrom Service" a company owned by the labour union of Petrom, but it kept its editorial stance. It was one of the newspapers involved in the 'governmental advertising funds for political subversion' scandal of 2004 (see Adrian Năstase).

Overall the newspaper had a low readership and circulation for a national newspaper - at its peak distributing no more than 10.000 copies daily, out of which less than 6.000 paid for.
Publishing of the newspaper ceased on 1 January 2010, the editorial board claiming that Gardianul would switch to a web-only new-media format. However, by the end of January 2010, Gardianuls website was also shut down.

Notes

References
Informaţia, Revista presei în ianuarie 2005, 14 January 2005
Cartianu, Grigore et al. Evenimentul Zilei, Domnule Nastase, am aflat noi cine a dat bani presei!, 3 February 2005
Biroul Roman de Audit al Tirajelor (The Romanian Circulation Audit Office).official industry dataset

Newspapers published in Bucharest
Romanian-language newspapers
Newspapers established in 2002
Publications disestablished in 2010
Defunct newspapers published in Romania
2002 establishments in Romania
2010 disestablishments in Romania
Daily newspapers published in Romania